Citizens' Radio is a radio station in Hong Kong established by pro-democracy camp figure Tsang Kin Shing. The station is run as a non-profit organization. It started trial broadcasting on 3 October 2005 on 102.8 MHz FM. The regular broadcasting hours are 7:00 pm–12:00 pm from Monday to Friday. The programmes can be heard in parts of Hong Kong Island, most of Kowloon, and on the Internet.

Purpose
The principle of the station is "Be open and bravely speak out", so the main type of programming is a speech-based "phone-in" format. Sometimes Hong Kong legislators are invited as special guests. The station has also made live broadcasts of the Hong Kong 1 July marches and Vindicate 4 June and Relay Torch in the past.

Tsang has submitted an application for a sound broadcasting licence to the Broadcasting Authority, but the application is still pending. So technically speaking Citizens Radio's broadcasts are illegal. On 29 August 2006 with the court search warrant, the Office of the Telecommunications Authority forced the station to close down. But the station resumed broadcasting on 4 October 2006. The station has been repeatedly raided by the Telecommunications Authority since but it kept on broadcasting as a form of civil disobedience.

Citizens' Radio broadcast incident

Event
On 25 May 2007 Szeto Wah was speaking in a Mong Kok pedestrianised street hosted by Citizen's Radio. The topic of the programme involved the Tiananmen Square protests of 1989.

Charges
Eight people including Szeto Wah were prosecuted. According to the summons, Szeto was using unlicensed radio equipment when delivering the political message. Only the chief executive or the director general of the Telecommunications Authority have the power to approve licences for such equipment.

Selective prosecution
Szeto said he was discriminated against for this event, and had appeared on the same station before without being charged. Other members who have spoken on the radio station included Anthony Cheung Bing Leung and legislator Choy So-yuk of the pro-Beijing Democratic Alliance for the Betterment of Hong Kong. They were not charged. Leung Kwok-hung (Longhair) added that this is "selective prosecution".  Mak Yin-ting, general secretary of the Hong Kong Journalists Association have said "Everything is subject to government discretion. The government can grant or deny you a licence as long as it wishes. It is not in accordance with the rule of law."

Others
After the prosecution, Hong Kong's Secretary for Justice Wong Yan Lung slumped to a six-month low in public confidence.

The latest case follows an ongoing lawsuit in which Tsang and Leung are arguing that the Telecommunications Ordinance, specifically the granting of broadcasting licences, was unconstitutional.

Post charges broadcasts
 On 20 April 2008 the station made a broadcast in Mong Kok after a three months break. It was hosted by radio founder Tsang Kin-shing. He was joined by veteran pro-democracy activist Szeto Wah and chairman of the League of Social Democrats Wong Yuk-man. Five other legislators also took part in the unlicensed broadcast.
 On 4 May 2008 another public broadcast was made at Times Square.

Court
 On 8 Jan 2008 the ruling by magistrate Douglas Yau Tak-hong said certain provisions of the broadcasting law in the Telecommunication Ordinance was unconstitutional.
 On 23 May 2008 six lawmakers and five democracy activists appeared in Eastern district court. The case was adjourned until 15 October 2008 waiting for the ruling of Douglas Yau.

 On 10 Sept 2008 the rulings by magistrate Douglas Yau will be heard in the Court of Appeal.
 On 12 Dec 2008 the HK government won its appeal against the dismissal of charges against Citizens' Radio activists for broadcasting without a licence.

Raid
The Office of the Telecommunications Authority (OFTA) mounted an enforcement operation against Citizens' Radio and raided the radio equipment on 19 December 2008. Activist Tsang Kin-shing said the equipment was worth HK$20,000 to HK$30,000.

References

External links

Official Homepage of Citizens Radio
 

Radio stations in Hong Kong
Pirate radio stations
2005 establishments in Hong Kong
Radio stations established in 2005